The following is List of Universities and Colleges in Henan.

Provincial
Zhengzhou University  Double First Class 
Henan University  Double First Class 
Henan Normal University
Henan Agricultural University  
Anyang Normal University
Henan College of Traditional Chinese Medicine 
Henan Polytechnic University
Henan University of Animal Husbandry and Economy
Henan University of Finance and Economics 
Henan University of Science and Technology 
Henan University of Technology 
Huanghe Science and Technology College
Luoyang Institute of Science and Technology
Nanyang Institute of Technology 
Nanyang Normal University (南阳师范学院) 
North China University of Water Conservancy and Electric Power Ω
Shangqiu Normal University 
Shengda Economics, Trade and Management College of Zhengzhou 
Sias International University 
Xinyang Agricultural College 
Xinyang Normal University 
Zhengzhou University of Light Industry Ω
Zhongyuan University of Technology 
Nanyang Medical College()

References

List of Chinese Higher Education Institutions — Ministry of Education
List of Chinese universities, including official links
Henan Institutions Admitting International Students

 
Henan